The 2016 Worthing Borough Council election took place on 5 May 2016 to elect members of Worthing Borough Council in England. This was on the same day as other local elections.

Council results

Ward results

Broadwater ward

Castle ward

Central ward

Durrington ward

Gaisford ward

Goring ward

Heene ward

Marine ward

Northbrook ward

Offington ward

Salvington ward

Selden ward

Tarring ward

References

2016 English local elections
2016
2010s in West Sussex